Terry Randolph Hummer (born August 7, 1950) is an American poet, critic, essayist, editor, and professor. His most recent books of poetry are After the Afterlife (Acre Books) and the three linked volumes Ephemeron, Skandalon, and Eon (Louisiana State University Press). He has published poems in literary journals and magazines including The New Yorker, Harper's, Atlantic Monthly, The Literati Quarterly, Paris Review, and Georgia Review. His honors include a Guggenheim Fellowship inclusion in the 1995 edition of Best American Poetry, the Hanes Prize for Poetry, the Richard Wright Award for Literary Excellence, and three Pushcart Prizes.

Early life
Hummer was born and raised in Mississippi, and graduated from University of Southern Mississippi with a B. A. in 1972 and M. A. in 1974. He studied with Gordon Weaver and D.C. Berry. He graduated from the University of Utah with a PhD, where he studied with Dave Smith and was editor of Quarterly West in 1979.

Career
He taught at Oklahoma State University, where he was poetry editor of The Cimarron Review. In 1984 he relocated to Kenyon College; there, after visiting positions at Middlebury College (where he guest edited New England Review) and the University of California at Irvine, he became editor of The Kenyon Review. In 1989 he returned to Middlebury as editor of New England Review. He relocated to the University of Oregon in 1993, where he directed the MFA Program in Creative Writing. In 1997, he taught at Virginia Commonwealth University. He taught at the University of Georgia, and was editor of The Georgia Review. He retired from Arizona State University.

Honors and awards
 1992 Guggenheim Fellowship
 National Endowment for the Arts Fellowship
 Pushcart Prize (twice)
 Donald Justice Award for Poetry

Bibliography

Poetry
Collections
 
 
 Lower-Class Heresy (University of Illinois, 1987)
 
 Walt Whitman in Hell: Poems (Louisiana State University Press, 1996)
 
 
 

Eon: Poems. LSU Press Southern Messenger Poets. 2018.

Chapbooks
 Urn (Diode Editions, 2015)
 Translation of Light (Cedar Creek Press, 1976)
Appearances in anthologies
 
 
 
 
 
List of poems

Essays
 The Muse in the Machine: Essays on Poetry And the Anatomy of the Body Politic (The Life of Poetry: Poets on Their Art and Craft). University of Georgia Press, 2006.
 
 Available Surfaces: Essays on Poesis (Poets on Poetry). University of Michigan Press, 2012

References

External links
 Author's Website
 Author's Blog
 Author Page: Louisiana State University Press > T.R. Hummer
 Interview: Blackbird, February 16, 2004
 Poems: Little Epic Against Oblivion> October 7, 2008 > Poems by T.R. Hummer
 Poems: Mudlark Poster 81 > 2009 > System, Fallacy of Composition, Bald Man, Fallacy The Illegibility of Providence, Infinite by Virtue of Its Everlastingness, Bounded by its Own Completeness by T.R. Hummer
 Poems: The Poetry Foundation > Poets > Greek by T.R. Hummer

1950 births
Living people
American male poets
University of Southern Mississippi alumni
University of Utah alumni
People from Macon, Mississippi
Poets from Mississippi
American essayists
The New Yorker people
Writers from Phoenix, Arizona
Middlebury College faculty
Kenyon College faculty
University of California, Irvine faculty
University of Oregon faculty
Arizona State University faculty
University of Georgia faculty
Poets from Arizona
American male essayists